This is a list of educational institutions named after U.S. presidents. Institutions are listed under their respective president's name; presidents are listed alphabetically.

Adams 
 Schools are named for John Adams and John Quincy Adams, see Adams High School
 Adams House (Harvard University)
 John Adams Middle School (Kanawha County Schools, Charleston, West Virginia)

Biden 
 Biden School of Public Policy and Administration at the University of Delaware

Buchanan 
 A public high school and middle school are named for James Buchanan in Mercersburg, Pennsylvania

G. H. W. Bush 
 George Herbert Walker Bush Elementary School in Addison, Texas 
George Bush High School in Richmond, Texas
Bush School of Government and Public Service at Texas A&M University in College Station, Texas

G. W. Bush 
 George W. Bush Elementary School in St. Paul, Texas
 George W. Bush Elementary School in Stockton, California

Carter  
 The Carter Center in Atlanta, Georgia, is an educational institution, among other things.
 Jimmy Carter Early College High School, La Joya, Texas
 Jimmy Carter Middle School, Albuquerque, New Mexico

Cleveland 
 Cleveland High School (Portland, Oregon)

Clinton 
 Clinton School of Public Service of the University of Arkansas
 William Jefferson Clinton Elementary School, Paramount, California
 William Jefferson Clinton Middle School, Historic South Central Los Angeles
William J. Clinton Elementary School, La Joya, Texas
William Jefferson Clinton Primary School, Hope, Arkansas

Coolidge 
 New England Law Boston, initially named Calvin Coolidge Law School
 Coolidge Senior High School (Washington, D.C.)
 Coolidge High School, Coolidge, Arizona
 Coolidge Middle School (disambiguation)

Eisenhower 
 Eisenhower College, Seneca Falls, New York, closed in 1982
 The Eisenhower Institute, part of Gettysburg College, Gettysburg, Pennsylvania
 Eisenhower High School (disambiguation)
 Eisenhower Middle School (disambiguation)
 Nova Dwight D. Eisenhower Elementary School, Davie, Florida
 Eisenhower Elementary School, Independence, Kansas

Fillmore 
 Millard Fillmore College (permanently closed)

Ford 
 Gerald R. Ford School of Public Policy, part of the University of Michigan, Ann Arbor, Michigan

Grant 
 Grant High School (Portland, Oregon)
 Grant Community School, Salem, Oregon
 U.S. Grant High School (Oklahoma)

Harding 
 Warren Harding High School, Bridgeport, Connecticut
 Warren G. Harding High School (Warren, Ohio)
 Warren G. Harding Middle School, Philadelphia, Pennsylvania

W. Harrison 
 William Henry Harrison High School (Evansville, Indiana)
 William Henry Harrison High School (West Lafayette, Indiana)
 William Henry Harrison High School (Ohio), Harrison, Ohio

Hoover 
 Herbert Hoover High School (disambiguation)
 Herbert Hoover Junior High School, San Francisco, California
 Herbert Hoover Middle School, Potomac, Maryland
 Hoover Middle School, Waterloo, Iowa
 Hoover Elementary, Medford, Oregon
 Hoover Elementary, Salem, Oregon
 Herbert Hoover Elementary, Langhorne, Pennsylvania 
 Hoover Institution, a public policy think tank and research institution formally a part of Stanford University

Jackson 
 Jackson Middle School, Portland, Oregon
 Jackson Elementary, Medford, Oregon
 Jackson High School (disambiguation)
 Andrew Jackson Fundamental Magnet High School,  St. Bernard Parish, Louisiana, later Andrew Jackson Elementary School, now Andrew Jackson Middle School
 Andrew Jackson Middle School (Kanawha County Schools), Cross Lanes, West Virginia

Jefferson 

 Jefferson College (disambiguation)
 Jefferson Community College (disambiguation)
 Jefferson Elementary School (disambiguation)
 Jefferson School (disambiguation)
 Thomas Jefferson Junior High School (disambiguation)
 Thomas Jefferson Junior High School (disambiguation)
 Thomas Jefferson School of Law
 Thomas Jefferson University

A. Johnson 
 Andrew Johnson Elementary School, Kingsport City Schools, Kingsport, Tennessee
 Pre-K Center in Johnson, Oklahoma City

L. Johnson 
 Lyndon B. Johnson School of Public Affairs of the University of Texas at Austin
 Lyndon B. Johnson High School (Austin, Texas)
 Lyndon B. Johnson High School, Johnson City, Texas
 Lyndon B. Johnson High School, Laredo, Texas 
 Lyndon B. Johnson Middle School, Albuquerque, New Mexico
 Lyndon B. Johnson Middle School, Johnson City, Texas
 Lyndon B. Johnson Middle School, Pharr, Texas
 Lyndon B. Johnson Elementary School, Johnson City, Texas

Kennedy 
 John F. Kennedy School of Government of Harvard University
 John F. Kennedy University
 John F. Kennedy College, Wahoo, Nebraska
 John F. Kennedy High School (disambiguation)
 President Kennedy School, a coeducational secondary school and sixth form with academy status in Coventry, England
 Kennedy Middle School (disambiguation)
 John F. Kennedy Elementary School, Keizer, Oregon
 Kennedy Elementary, Medford, Oregon
 John F. Kennedy Special Warfare Center and School, Fort Bragg, North Carolina
John F. Kennedy Middle School, Cupertino, California

Lincoln 
 Lincoln University (California), a private university in Oakland
 Lincoln University (Missouri), a public, historically black, land-grant university in Jefferson City
 Lincoln University (Pennsylvania), a public, historically black university near Oxford
 Lincoln Memorial University, a private university in Harrogate, Tennessee
 Lincoln University College, Malaysia
 Lincoln College (Illinois), a private college in Lincoln
 Lincoln Land Community College, a public community college in Springfield, Illinois
 Abraham Lincoln High School (disambiguation)
 Lincoln High School (disambiguation), includes some schools that may not be named after the president
 Lincoln Junior High School, Bentonville, Arkansas
 Lincoln Center Institute, the education division of the Lincoln Center for the Performing Arts
 Lincoln Law School of Sacramento, a private, for-profit law school
 Lincoln Law School of San Jose, a private, non-profit law school
 Lincoln School (disambiguation)
 Lincoln Elementary School (disambiguation)

Madison 
 James Madison Intermediate, Edison, New Jersey
 James Madison Primary, Edison, New Jersey
 James Madison University, Harrisonburg, Virginia
 James Madison College of Michigan State University
 James Madison High School (disambiguation)
 James Madison Middle School
 Madison High School (disambiguation)
 Madison County High School (disambiguation)

McKinley 
 McKinley High School (disambiguation)
 McKinley High School (Sebring, Ohio)
 William McKinley Elementary School Salem, Oregon

Monroe 
 Monroe College, a private, for-profit college in New York City
 James Monroe High School (disambiguation)

Nixon 
 Richard M. Nixon Elementary School, Hiawatha, Iowa
 Nixon Elementary School, Landing, New Jersey

Obama 
 Barack & Michelle Obama Elementary School, St Paul, Minnesota
Barack & Michelle Obama Academy, Atlanta, Georgia
Barack H. Obama Magnet Elementary, Jackson, Mississippi
Barack Obama School, Pine Lawn, Missouri
Barack Obama Global Preparation Academy, Los Angeles, California
Barack Obama Leadership Academy, Detroit, Michigan
Barack Obama School of Leadership and STEM, Chicago Heights, Illinois
Barack Obama School, Maple Heights, Ohio
Barack Obama School of Career and Technical Education, Milwaukee, Wisconsin
Barack Obama Learning Academy, Hazel Crest, Illinois
Barack and Michelle Obama 9th Grade Campus, Lancaster, Texas
Barack Obama Green Charter High School, Plainfield, New Jersey
 Barack Obama Charter School, Willowbrook, California
 Barack Obama Elementary School, Hempstead, New York
Barack Obama Elementary School, Richmond, Virginia
 President Barack Obama School - Public School 34, Jersey City, New Jersey
 Barack Obama Elementary School, Upper Marlboro, Maryland
 The Barack Obama Academy of International Studies, Pittsburgh, Pennsylvania
 Barack Obama Male Leadership Academy, Dallas, Texas.
 Barack H. Obama Magnet University School, New Haven, Connecticut.
 Barack H. Obama Elementary Magnet School of Science and Technology, DeKalb County School District, Atlanta, Georgia

Pierce 
 Franklin Pierce University, a private university in Rindge, New Hampshire
 University of New Hampshire School of Law (formerly Franklin Pierce Law Center)

Polk 
 Polk Middle School, Albuquerque, New Mexico
 Polk Elementary School, Fresno, California

Reagan 
 Ronald Reagan High School (disambiguation)
 Ronald Wilson Reagan Middle School, Haymarket, Virginia
 Ronald Reagan Elementary, Omaha (Millard), Nebraska

Roosevelt 

 University College Roosevelt, Middelburg, Zeeland
 Roosevelt Institution
 Roosevelt University
 Roosevelt Elementary, Medford, Oregon
 Numerous Roosevelt High Schools in the United States are listed under this wikilink. The list includes high schools named for Theodore Roosevelt, Franklin D. Roosevelt, and Eleanor Roosevelt.

Taft 
 William Howard Taft University
 William Howard Taft High School (disambiguation)
 Taft Elementary School, Lincoln City, Oregon
 Taft 7-12 School, Lincoln City, Oregon

Truman 
 Harry S Truman School of Public Affairs at the University of Missouri
 Truman State University
 Harry S Truman College
 Truman High School (Independence, Missouri)

Tyler 
 John Tyler Community College
 John Tyler High School

Van Buren 
 Martin Van Buren High School

Washington 

 Washington University in St. Louis, Missouri
 George Washington University, Washington, D.C.
 Washington and Lee University, Lexington, Virginia
 Washington College, Chestertown, Maryland
 Washington & Jefferson College, Washington, Pennsylvania
 George Washington High School (disambiguation)
 Washington and Lee High School, Montross, Virginia
 Washington Junior High School, Bentonville, Arkansas
 George Washington Elementary School, Salem, Oregon
 Washington Elementary, in Medford, Oregon

Wilson 
 Wilson College, Princeton University
 Woodrow Wilson International Center for Scholars
 Woodrow Wilson School of Public and International Affairs
 Woodrow Wilson High School (disambiguation)
 Wilson Elementary, Medford, Oregon

See also
 Presidential memorials in the United States

References

 Educational institutions
Named for U.S. Presidents
Named for U.S. Presidents
Educational institutions U.S. Presidents